Lee Ki-woo (born October 23, 1981) is a South Korean actor. He is best known for his roles in The Classic (2003), Tale of Cinema (2005), A Love to Kill (2005), Flower Boy Ramyun Shop (2011), Rain or Shine (2017–2018), and My Liberation Notes (2022).

Personal life
Lee enlisted for his mandatory military service on November 9, 2009, and after 22 months of active duty at the Armed Forces Seoul Hospital, he was discharged on September 1, 2011.

Relationship and marriage 
On August 23, 2022, Lee's agency announced that he is getting married to his non-celebrity girlfriend in September in Jeju Island. They married in a private ceremony on September 24, 2022 in some place on Jeju Island, where only family members and friends attended.

Philanthropy 
In November 2022, Lee donated a television appearance fee to a shelter for stray dogs.

Filmography

Film

Television series

Television show

Music video

Awards and nominations

References

External links
  
 Lee Ki-woo at Wid May
 
 
 

South Korean male television actors
South Korean male film actors
South Korean male models
Male actors from Seoul
1981 births
Living people